Andrea D'Amico may refer to:
Andrea D'Amico (football agent) (born 1964), Italian football agent
Andrea D'Amico (footballer) (born 1989), Italian footballer

See also
D'Amico (disambiguation)